Maplewood is a train station that serves New Jersey Transit's Morristown Line and Gladstone Branch (commonly known as the Morris and Essex Lines) in the township of Maplewood, Essex County, New Jersey. Located in downtown Maplewood at 145 Dunnell Road (near the intersection with Maplewood Avenue), the station services trains from New York Penn Station and Hoboken Terminal to the east along with trains to Summit, Dover, Hackettstown and Gladstone to the west.

History 
Service in Maplewood began on September 28, 1837 with the opening of the Morris and Essex Railroad. At that time, service in then-Jefferson Village was limited to a flag stop at the Montgomery–Ogden House on Jefferson Street, a house built in the 18th century. Daniel Beach and his wife bought the property and the kitchen served as the waiting room for trains to stop. Known only as the "Stone House" stop, the name Maplewood was not attached until . The Montgomery–Ogden House served as the station until 1859, when a new depot was built by a land speculator at Baker Street and Maplewood Avenue.

The 1860 depot was replaced by the Delaware, Lackawanna and Western Railroad in 1901 with the current structure. Construction finished in January 1902.

Station layout

Parking is available in a small lot just to the east of the station on the eastbound side (Lot 1) and a lot one block west of the station on the westbound side (Lot 4). There are also several signed areas along nearby streets, referred to as Lots 2 and 3.

Parking is restricted to Maplewood residents with permits from 6:00–9:00 a.m. on weekdays or non-permit holders for a $3 fee. At all other times, parking is free of charge, but overnight parking is not allowed. Bicycle lockers are also provided.

The station has two low-level platforms connected by a tunnel. Not all trains stop at this station, and trains may pass through the station on any track.

Bibliography

References

External links

 Station House from Google Maps Street View

NJ Transit Rail Operations stations
Railway stations in Essex County, New Jersey
Former Delaware, Lackawanna and Western Railroad stations
Maplewood, New Jersey
1837 establishments in New Jersey
Railway stations in the United States opened in 1837